The 2021 Kansas City Royals season was the 53rd season of the franchise, and their 49th season at Kauffman Stadium. The team finished with a 74–88 win–loss record, landing them in fourth place in the American League Central ahead of the Minnesota Twins by one game.

Regular season
The Royals won 14–10 against the Texas Rangers to open the season. The 14 runs set a Royals franchise record for Opening Day.

Season standings

American League Central

American League Wild Card

Record against opponents

Game log 

|- style="background:#bfb;"
| 1 || April 1 || Rangers || 14–10 || Hernández (1–0) || Cody (0–1) || Davis (1) || 9,155 || 1–0 || W1
|- style="background:#bfb;"
| 2 || April 3 || Rangers || 11–4 || Minor (1–0) || Sborz (0–1) || — || 8,889 || 2–0 || W2
|- style="background:#fbb;"
| 3 || April 4 || Rangers || 3–7 || Lyles (1–0) || Singer (0–1) || — || 8,869 || 2–1 || L1
|- style="background:#bfb;"
| 4 || April 5 || @ Indians || 3–0 || Duffy (1–0) || Allen (0–1) || Hahn (1) || 8,914 || 3–1 || W1
|- style="background:#fbb;"
| 5 || April 7 || @ Indians || 2–4 || Clase (1–0) || Holland (0–1) || Wittgren (1) || 5,908 || 3–2 || L1
|- style="background:#fbb;"
| 6 || April 8 || @ White Sox || 0–6 || Lynn (1–0) || Keller (0–1) || — || 8,207 || 3–3 || L2
|- style="background:#bbb;"
| – || April 10 || @ White Sox || colspan=7 | Postponed (Rain, Makeup May 14)
|- style="background:#bfb;"
| 7 || April 11 || @ White Sox || 4–3  || Holland (1–1) || Crochet (0–1) || Zimmer (1) || 7,695 || 4–3 || W1
|- style="background:#fbb;"
| 8 || April 12 || Angels || 3–10 || Cobb (1–0) || Singer (0–2) || — || 6,962 || 4–4 || L1
|- style="background:#bfb;"
| 9 || April 13 || Angels || 3–2 || Duffy (2–0) || Bundy (0–1) || Holland (1) || 6,404 || 5–4 || W1
|- style="background:#bfb;"
| 10 || April 14 || Angels || 6–1 || Keller (1–1) || Canning (0–1) || — || 6,814 || 6–4 || W2
|- style="background:#bfb;"
| 11 || April 15 || Blue Jays || 7–5 || Junis (1–0) || Kay (0–1) || Barlow (1) || 6,266 || 7–4 || W3
|- style="background:#bbb;"
| — || April 16 || Blue Jays || colspan=7| Postponed (Rain, Makeup: April 17)
|- style="background:#fbb;"
| 12 || April 17  || Blue Jays || 1–5  || Matz (3–0) || Minor (1–1) || — || N/A || 7–5 || L1
|- style="background:#bfb;"
| 13 || April 17  || Blue Jays || 3–2  || Holland (2–1) || Payamps (0–1) || — || 8,950 || 8–5 || W1
|- style="background:#bfb;"
| 14 || April 18 || Blue Jays || 2–0 || Zimmer (1–0) || Zeuch (0–2) || Holland (2) || 9,042 || 9–5 || W2
|- style="background:#fbb;"
| 15 || April 19 || Rays || 1–4 || Fleming (1–1) || Duffy (2–1) || — || 5,589 || 9–6 || L1
|- style="background:#fbb;"
| 16 || April 20 || Rays || 7–14 || Kittredge (3–0) || Keller (1–2) || Richards (1) || 4,481 || 9–7 || L2
|- style="background:#bfb;"
| 17 || April 21 || Rays || 9–8 || Barlow (1–0) || Castillo (0–1) || — || 5,053 || 10–7 || W1
|- style="background:#bfb;"
| 18 || April 23 || @ Tigers || 6–2 || Minor (2–1) || Mize (1–2) || — || 8,000 || 11–7 || W2
|- style="background:#bfb;"
| 19 || April 24 || @ Tigers || 2–1 || Singer (1–2) || Boyd (2–2) || Staumont (1) || 8,000 || 12–7 || W3
|- style="background:#bfb;"
| 20 || April 25 || @ Tigers || 4–0 || Duffy (3–1) || Skubal (0–3) || — || 8,000 || 13–7 || W4
|- style="background:#bfb;"
| 21 || April 26 || @ Tigers || 3–2 || Keller (2–2) || Turnbull (1–1) || Staumont (2) || 7,288 || 14–7 || W5
|- style="background:#fbb;"
| 22 || April 27 || @ Pirates || 1–2 || Underwood Jr. (1–0) || Junis (1–1) || Rodríguez (4) || 5,510 || 14–8 || L1
|- style="background:#bfb;"
| 23 || April 28 || @ Pirates || 9–6 || Zimmer (2–0) || Keller (1–3) || Staumont (3) || 4,226 || 15–8 || W1
|- style="background:#fbb;"
| 24 || April 30 || @ Twins || 1–9 || Pineda (2–1) || Singer (1–3) || — || 9,982 || 15–9 || L1
|-

|- style="background:#bfb;"
| 25 || May 1 || @ Twins || 11–3 || Duffy (4–1) || Shoemaker (1–3) || — || 9,993 || 16–9 || W1
|- style="background:#fbb;"
| 26 || May 2 || @ Twins || 4–13 || Berríos (3–2) || Keller (2–3) || — || 9,997 || 16–10 || L1
|- style="background:#fbb;"
| 27 || May 3 || Indians || 6–8 || Shaw (1–0) || Junis (1–2) || Clase (6) || 6,919 || 16–11 || L2
|- style="background:#fbb;"
| 28 || May 4 || Indians || 3–7 || Wittgren (1–1) || Staumont (0–1)|| — || 5,997 || 16–12 || L3
|- style="background:#fbb;"
| 29 || May 5 || Indians || 4–5 || Wittgren (2–1) || Davis (0–1) || Karinchak (3) || 9,640 || 16–13 || L4
|- style="background:#fbb;"
| 30 || May 6 || Indians || 0–4 || McKenzie (1–1) || Duffy (4–2) || — || 9,259 || 16–14 || L5
|- style="background:#fbb;"
| 31 || May 7 || White Sox || 0–3 || Rodón (5–0) || Keller (2–4) || Hendriks (6) || 16,011 || 16–15 || L6
|- style="background:#fbb;"
| 32 || May 8 || White Sox || 1–9 || Lynn (3–1) || Lynch (0–1) || — || 15,895 || 16–16 || L7
|- style="background:#fbb;"
| 33 || May 9 || White Sox || 3–9 || Giolito (2–3) || Minor (2–2) || — || 12,102 || 16–17 || L8
|- style="background:#fbb;"
| 34 || May 11 || @ Tigers || 7–8 || Soto (3–1) || Barlow (1–1) || — || 7,312 || 16–18 || L9
|- style="background:#fbb;"
| 35 || May 12 || @ Tigers || 2–4 || Mize (2–3) || Duffy (4–3) || Soto (4) || 7,133 || 16–19 || L10
|- style="background:#fbb;"
| 36 || May 13 || @ Tigers || 3–4 || Turnbull (2–2) || Lynch (0–2) || Fulmer (2) || 7,369 || 16–20 || L11
|- style="background:#bfb;"
| 37 || May 14  || @ White Sox || 6–2  || Keller (3–4) || Giolito (2–4) || — || 8,574 || 17–20 || W1
|- style="background:#fbb;"
| 38 || May 14  || @ White Sox || 1–3  || Heuer (3–1)|| Junis (1–3)|| Hendriks (8) || 9,823 || 17–21 || L1
|- style="background:#bfb;"
| 39 || May 15 || @ White Sox || 5–1 || Minor (3–2) || Rodón (5–1) || — || 9,886 || 18–21 || W1
|- style="background:#fbb;"
| 40 || May 16 || @ White Sox || 3–4 || Foster (2–1) || Davis (0–2) || — || 9,928 || 18–22 || L1
|- style="background:#bfb;"
| 41 || May 18 || Brewers || 2–0 || Brentz (1–0) || Woodruff (2–2) || Staumont (4) || 9,298 || 19–22 || W1
|- style="background:#bfb;"
| 42 || May 19 || Brewers || 6–4 || Barlow (2–1) || Feyereisen (0–2) || Staumont (5) || 8,950 || 20–22 || W2
|- style="background:#fbb;"
| 43 || May 21 || Tigers || 5–7 || Ureña (2–4) || Zuber (0–1) || Fulmer (4) || 17,080 || 20–23 || L1
|- style="background:#bfb;"
| 44 || May 22 || Tigers || 7–5 || Singer (2–3) || Boyd (2–5) || — || 14,226 || 21–23 || W1
|- style="background:#bfb;"
| 45 || May 23 || Tigers || 3–2 || Zimmer (3–0) || Fulmer (3–3) || — || 15,540 || 22–23 || W2
|- style="background:#bfb;"
| 46 || May 25 || @ Rays || 2–1 || Keller (4–4) || Hill (3–2) || Zimmer (2) || 4,946 || 23–23 || W3
|- style="background:#fbb;"
| 47 || May 26 || @ Rays || 1–2  || Feyereisen (1–2) || Zuber (0–2) || — || 4,973 || 23–24 || L1
|- style="background:#fbb;"
| 48 || May 27 || @ Rays || 2–7 || McClanahan (2–0) || Singer (2–4) || — || 5,519 || 23–25 || L2
|- style="background:#bfb;"
| 49 || May 28 || @ Twins || 8–3 || Bubic (1–0) || Dobnak (1–4) || — || 14,260 || 24–25 || W1
|- style="background:#fbb;"
| 50 || May 29 || @ Twins || 5–6 || Happ (3–2) || Santana (0–1) || Rogers (4) || 18,444 || 24–26 || L1
|- style="background:#bfb;"
| 51 || May 30 || @ Twins || 6–3 || Keller (5–4) || Shoemaker (2–6) || Holland (3) || 17,923 || 25–26 || W1
|- style="background:#bfb;"
| 52 || May 31 || Pirates || 7–3 || Minor (4–2) || Kuhl (0–2) || — || 12,604 || 26–26 || W2
|-

|- style="background:#bfb;"
| 53 || June 1 || Pirates || 10–5 || Singer (3–4) || Crowe (0–4) || — || 10,333 || 27–26 || W3
|- style="background:#bfb;"
| 54 || June 3 || Twins || 6–5 || Junis (2–3) || Robles (1–2) || Barlow (2) || 11,072 || 28–26 || W4
|- style="background:#bfb;"
| 55 || June 4 || Twins || 14–5 || Keller (6–4) || Shoemaker (2–7) || — || 22,612 || 29–26 || W5
|- style="background:#fbb;"
| 56 || June 5 || Twins || 4–5 || Berríos (6–2) || Minor (4–3) || Robles (5) || 21,574 || 29–27 || L1
|- style="background:#fbb;"
| 57 || June 6 || Twins || 1–2 || Farrell (1–0) || Singer (3–5) || Rogers (5) || 14,046 || 29–28 || L2
|- style="background:#fbb;"
| 58 || June 7 || @ Angels || 3–8 || Bundy (1–6) || Kowar (0–1) || — || 9,481 || 29–29 || L3
|- style="background:#fbb;"
| 59 || June 8 || @ Angels || 1–8 || Heaney (4–3) || Bubic (1–1) || — || 9,387 || 29–30 || L4
|- style="background:#fbb;"
| 60 || June 9 || @ Angels || 1–6 || Canning (5–4) || Keller (6–5) || — || 10,474 || 29–31 || L5
|- style="background:#bfb;"
| 61 || June 10 || @ Athletics || 6–1 || Minor (5–3) || Montas (6–6) || — || 3,211 || 30–31 || W1
|- style="background:#fbb;"
| 62 || June 11 || @ Athletics || 3–4 || Trivino (3–2) || Barlow (2–2) || — || 6,964 || 30–32 || L1
|- style="background:#fbb;"
| 63 || June 12 || @ Athletics || 2–11 || Kaprielian (3–1) || Kowar (0–1) || — || 7,678 || 30–33 || L2
|- style="background:#fbb;"
| 64 || June 13 || @ Athletics || 3–6 || Bassitt (7–2) || Bubic (1–2) || Trivino (10) || 7,060 || 30–34 || L3
|- style="background:#fbb;"
| 65 || June 14 || Tigers || 3–10 || Jiménez (2–0) || Keller (6–6) || — || 11,910 || 30–35 || L4
|- style="background:#fbb;"
| 66 || June 15 || Tigers || 3–4 || Mize (4–4) || Minor (5–4) || Soto (6) || 15,947 || 30–36 || L5
|- style="background:#fbb;"
| 67 || June 16 || Tigers || 5–6 || Skubal (4–7) || Holland (2–2) || Fulmer (5) || 11,327 || 30–37 || L6
|- style="background:#bfb;"
| 68 || June 18 || Red Sox || 5–3 || Bubic (2–2) || Pivetta (6–3) || Holland (4) || 29,870 || 31–37 || W1
|- style="background:#fbb;"
| 69 || June 19 || Red Sox || 1–7 || Pérez (5–4) || Keller (6–7) || — || 24,568 || 31–38 || L1
|- style="background:#bfb;"
| 70 || June 20 || Red Sox || 7–3 || Minor (6–4) || Eovaldi (7–4) || — || 20,726 || 32–38 || W1
|- style="background:#bfb;"
| 71 || June 22 || @ Yankees || 6–5 || Brentz (2–0) || Loáisiga (7–3) || Holland (5) || 21,130 || 33–38 || W2
|- style="background:#fbb;"
| 72 || June 23 || @ Yankees || 5–6 || Chapman (5–2) || Holland (2–3) || — || 25,032 || 33–39 || L1
|- style="background:#fbb;"
| 73 || June 24 || @ Yankees || 1–8 || Taillon (2–4) || Keller (6–8) || — || 21,350 || 33–40 || L2
|- style="background:#fbb;"
| 74 || June 25 || @ Rangers || 4–9 || Dunning (3–6) || Minor (6–5) || — || 30,389 || 33–41 || L3
|- style="background:#fbb;"
| 75 || June 26 || @ Rangers || 0–8 || Gibson (6–0) || Bubic (2–3) || — || 31,612 || 33–42 || L4
|- style="background:#fbb;"
| 76 || June 27 || @ Rangers || 1–4 || Lyles (3–5) || Singer (3–6) || Kennedy (13) || 29,046 || 33–43 || L5
|- style="background:#fbb;"
| 77 || June 28 || @ Red Sox || 5–6 || Sawamura (4–0) || Staumont (0–2) || Barnes (17) || 22,766 || 33–44 || L6
|- style="background:#fbb;"
| 78 || June 29 || @ Red Sox || 6–7 || Ríos (2–0) || Brentz (2–1) || Barnes (18) || 25,180 || 33–45 || L7
|- style="background:#fbb;"
| 79 || June 30 || @ Red Sox || 2–6 || Pérez (6–4) || Minor (6–6) || — || 24,616 || 33–46 || L8
|-

|- style="background:#fbb;"
| 80 || July 1 || @ Red Sox || 1–15 || Eovaldi (9–4) || Bubic (2–4) || — || 27,913 || 33–47 || L9
|- style="background:#bfb;"
| 81 || July 2 || Twins || 7–4 || Lovelady (1–0) || Happ (4–4) || Barlow (3) || 31,824 || 34–47 || W1
|- style="background:#bfb;"
| 82 || July 3 || Twins || 6–3 || Zimmer (4–0) || Jax (1–1) || Barlow (4) || 16,133 || 35–47 || W2
|- style="background:#fbb;"
| 83 || July 4 || Twins || 2–6 || Maeda (4–3) || Keller (6–9) || — || 15,350 || 35–48 || L1
|- style="background:#fbb;"
| 84 || July 5 || Reds || 2–6 || Gutiérrez (4–3) || Minor (6–7) || — || 14,709 || 35–49 || L2
|- style="background:#bfb;"
| 85 || July 6 || Reds || 7–6 || Lovelady (2–0) || Hembree (2–4) || — || 14,491 || 36–49 || W1
|- style="background:#fbb;"
| 86 || July 7 || Reds || 2–5 || Gray (2–4) || Barlow (2–3) || Hembree (4) || 11,457 || 36–50 || L1
|- style="background:#fbb;"
| 87 || July 8 || @ Indians || 4–7 || Karinchak (5–2) || Holland (2–4) || — || 13,272 || 36–51 || L2
|- style="background:#fbb;"
| 88 || July 9 || @ Indians || 1–2 || Karinchak (6–2) || Brentz (2–2) || — || 21,395 || 36–52 || L3
|- style="background:#fbb;"
| 89 || July 10 || @ Indians || 6–14 || Quantrill (1–2) || Minor (6–8) || — || 24,077 || 36–53 || L4
|- style="background:#bbb;" 
| — || July 11 || @ Indians || colspan=7 | Postponed (Rain, Makeup September 20)
|- style="text-align:center; background:#bbcaff;"
| colspan="10" | 91st All-Star Game in Denver, Colorado
|- style="background:#bfb;"
| 90 || July 16 || Orioles || 9–2 || Staumont (1–2) || Akin (0–5) || — || 23,763 || 37–53 || W1
|- style="background:#fbb;"
| 91 || July 17 || Orioles || 4–8 || Fry (3–3) || Singer (3–7) || — || 27,292 || 37–54 || L1
|- style="background:#fbb;"
| 92 || July 18 || Orioles || 0–5 || Harvey (4–10) || Hernández (1–1) || — || 13,706 || 37–55 || L2
|- style="background:#bfb;"
| 93 || July 20 || @ Brewers || 5–2 || Minor (7–8) || Strickland (0–1) || Holland (6) || 20,140 || 38–55 || W1
|- style="background:#bfb;"
| 94 || July 21 || @ Brewers || 6–3 || Keller (7–9) || Suter (9–5) || Barlow (5) || 30,063 || 39–55 || W2
|- style="background:#bfb;"
| 95 || July 23 || Tigers || 5–3 || Bubic (3–4) || Peralta (3–2) || Holland (7) || 24,912 || 40–55 || W3
|- style="background:#bfb;"
| 96 || July 24 || Tigers || 9–8 || Brentz (3–2) || Funkhouser (4–1) || Davis (2) || 24,616 || 41–55 || W4
|- style="background:#bfb;"
| 97 || July 25 || Tigers || 6–1 || Lynch (1–2) || Skubal (6–9) || — || 12,703 || 42–55 || W5
|- style="background:#bfb;"
| 98 || July 26 || White Sox || 4–3 || Minor (8–8) || Keuchel (7–4) || Barlow (6) || 12,384 || 43–55 || W6
|- style="background:#fbb;"
| 99 || July 27 || White Sox || 3–5 || López (1–0) || Zimmer (4–1) || Hendriks (25) || 14,298 || 43–56 || L1
|- style="background:#bfb;"
| 100 || July 28 || White Sox || 3–2  || Barlow (3–3) || Burr (2–1) || — || 13,626 || 44–56 || W1
|- style="background:#bfb;"
| 101 || July 29 || White Sox || 5–0 ||  Hernández (2–1) || Rodón (8–5) || — || 11,210 || 45–56 || W2
|- style="background:#fbb;"
| 102 || July 30 || @ Blue Jays || 4–6 || Stripling (4–6) || Lynch (1–3) || Romano (9) || 13,446 || 45–57 || L1
|- style="background:#fbb;"
| 103 || July 31 || @ Blue Jays || 0–4 || Manoah (3–1) || Minor (8–9) || — || 13,953 || 45–58 || L2
|-

|- style="background:#fbb;" 
| 104 || August 1 || @ Blue Jays || 1–5 || Berríos (8–5) || Keller (7–10) || — || 14,427 || 45–59 || L3
|- style="background:#fbb;" 
| 105 || August 3 || @ White Sox || 1–7 || Cease (8–6) || Bubic (3–5) || — || 19,369 || 45–60 || L4
|- style="background:#bfb;" 
| 106 || August 4 || @ White Sox || 9–1 ||  Hernández (3–1) || Giolito (8–8) || — || 22,793 || 46–60 || W1
|- style="background:#bfb;" 
| 107 || August 5 || @ White Sox || 3–2 || Lynch (2–3) || Keuchel (7–5) || Brentz (1) || 23,589 || 47–60 || W2
|- style="background:#fbb;" 
| 108 || August 6 || @ Cardinals || 2–4 || Wainwright (10–6) || Minor (8–10) || Reyes (25) || 29,090 || 47–61 || L1
|- style="background:#fbb;" 
| 109 || August 7 || @ Cardinals || 2–5 || García (1–0) || Keller (7–11) || Gallegos (2) || 36,615 || 47–62 || L2
|- style="background:#bfb;" 
| 110 || August 8 || @ Cardinals || 6–5 || Barlow (4–3) || Reyes (5–5) || Lovelady (1) || 31,943 || 48–62 || W1
|- style="background:#fbb;" 
| 111 || August 9 || Yankees || 6–8  || Holmes (4–2) || Holland (2–5) || Peralta (3) || 18,477 || 48–63 || L1
|- style="background:#bfb;" 
| 112 || August 10 || Yankees || 8–4 || Staumont (2–2) || Cortés Jr. (0–1) || — || 18,218 || 49–63 || W1
|- style="background:#fbb;"  
| 113 || August 11 || Yankees || 2–5 || Green (6–5) || Singer (3–8) || Britton (1) || 13,748 || 49–64 || L1
|- style="background:#fbb;" 
| 114 || August 13 || Cardinals || 0–6 || Flaherty (9–1) || Minor (8–11) || — || 30,620 || 49–65 || L2
|- style="background:#fbb;" 
| 115 || August 14 || Cardinals || 4–9 || Lester (4–6) || Keller (7–12) || — || 35,784 || 49–66 || L3
|- style="background:#fbb;" 
| 116 || August 15 || Cardinals || 2–7 || Happ (7–6) || Bubic (3–6) || — || 18,317 || 49–67 || L4
|- style="background:#bfb;" 
| 117 || August 16 || Astros || 7–6 || Barlow (5–3) || García (3–8) || — || 10,228 || 50–67 || W1
|- style="background:#bfb;" 
| 118 || August 17 || Astros || 3–1 || Lynch (3–3) || Valdez (8–4) || Brentz (2) || 9,748 || 51–67 || W2
|- style="background:#bfb;" 
| 119 || August 18 || Astros || 3–2 || Tapia (1–0) || Taylor (2–4) || Barlow (7) || 12,278 || 52–67 || W3
|- style="background:#fbb;"
| 120 || August 19 || Astros || 3–6  || Pressly (5–1) || Davis (0–3) || Javier (2) || 9,884 || 52–68 || L1
|- style="background:#bfb;"
| 121 || August 20 || @ Cubs || 6–2 || Keller (8–12) || Davies (6–10) || — || 31,835 || 53–68 || W1
|- style="background:#bfb;" 
| 122 || August 21 || @ Cubs || 4–2 || Bubic (4–6) || Thompson (3–3) || Barlow (8) || 34,005 || 54–68 || W2
|- style="background:#bfb;" 
| 123 || August 22 || @ Cubs || 9–1 || Hernández (4–1) || Mills (5–6) || — || 29,640 || 55–68 || W3
|- style="background:#bfb;"
| 124 || August 23 || @ Astros || 7–1 || Lynch (4–3) || Greinke (11–4) || — || 18,742 || 56–68 || W4
|- style="background:#fbb;" 
| 125 || August 24 || @ Astros || 0–4 || García (10–6) || Singer (3–9) || — || 22,964 || 56–69 || L1
|- style="background:#fbb;" 
| 126 || August 25 || @ Astros || 5–6  || Graveman (5–0) || Payamps (0–3) || — || 21,052 || 56–70 || L2
|- style="background:#bfb;"
| 127 || August 26 || @ Mariners || 6–4 || Santana (1–1) || Smith (2–2) || Barlow (9) || 16,882 || 57–70 || W1
|- style="background:#bfb;"
| 128 || August 27 || @ Mariners || 8–7  || Staumont (3–2) || Ramírez (0–2) || — || 22,953 || 58–70 || W2
|- style="background:#bfb;"
| 129 || August 28 || @ Mariners || 4–2 || Payamps (1–3) || Anderson (6–9) || Barlow (10) || 24,575 || 59–70 || W3
|- style="background:#fbb;" 
| 130 || August 29 || @ Mariners || 3–4 || Gonzales (6–5) || Zuber (0–3) || Steckenrider (7) || 20,044 || 59–71 || L1
|- style="background:#fbb;" 
| 131 || August 31 || Indians || 2–7 || Plesac (9–4) || Junis (2–4) || — || 11,542 || 59–72 || L2
|-

|- style="background:#fbb;" 
| 132 || September 1 || Indians || 3–5  || Parker (2–0) || Santana (1–2) || Stephan (1) || 10,516 || 59–73 || L3
|- style="background:#fbb;" 
| 133 || September 2 || Indians || 2–4 || McKenzie (4–5) || Minor (8–12) || Clase (20) || 10,042 || 59–74 || L4
|- style="background:#bfb;" 
| 134 || September 3 || White Sox || 7–2 || Hernández (5–1) || Keuchel (8–8) || — || 14,210 || 60–74 || W1
|- style="background:#fbb;" 
| 135 || September 4 || White Sox || 7–10 || Kimbrel (3–4) || Lynch (4–4) || Hendriks (32) || 18,800 || 60–75 || L1
|- style="background:#bfb;" 
| 136 || September 5 || White Sox || 6–0 || Singer (4–9) || Cease (11–7) || — || 19,696 || 61–75 || W1
|- style="background:#bfb;" 
| 137 || September 6 || @ Orioles || 3–2 || Tapia (2–0) || Sulser (4–4) || Barlow (11) || 11,973 || 62–75 || W2
|- style="background:#fbb;" 
| 138 || September 7 || @ Orioles || 3–7 || Baumann (1–0) || Kowar (0–3) || — || 4,981 || 62–76 || L1
|- style="background:#fbb; 
| 139 || September 8 || @ Orioles || 8–9 || Barreda (1–0) || Staumont (3–3) || Wells (2) || 4,965 || 62–77 || L2
|- style="background:#bfb;" 
| 140 || September 9 || @ Orioles || 6–0 || Hernández (6–1) || Means (5–7) || — || 5,087 || 63–77 || W1
|- style="background:#bfb;" 
| 141 || September 10 || @ Twins || 6–4  || Santana (2–2) || Minaya (2–1) || Holland (8) || 20,803 || 64–77 || W2
|- style="background:#fbb;" 
| 142 || September 11 || @ Twins || 2–9 || Pineda (6–8) || Singer (4–10) || — || 19,532 || 64–78 || L1
|- style="background:#bfb;" 
| 143 || September 12 || @ Twins || 5–3 || Brentz (4–2) || Alcalá (3–6) || Barlow (12) || 19,496 || 65–78 || W1
|- style="background:#bfb;" 
| 144 || September 14 || Athletics || 10–7 || Brentz (5–2) || Petit (8–2) || Barlow (13) || 10,254 || 66–78 || W2
|- style="background:#fbb;" 
| 145 || September 15 || Athletics || 10–12 || Manaea (10–9) || Hernández (6–2) || Chafin (4) || 11,056 || 66–79 || L1
|- style="background:#fbb;"  
| 146 || September 16 || Athletics || 2–7 || Blackburn (1–2) || Lynch (4–5) || — || 11,729 || 66–80 || L2
|- style="background:#fbb;" 
| 147 || September 17 || Mariners || 2–6 || Flexen (12–6) || Heasley (0–1) || — || 14,904 || 66–81 || L3
|- style="background:#bfb;" 
| 148 || September 18 || Mariners || 8–1 || Bubic (5–6) || Kikuchi (7–9) || — || 20,085 || 67–81 || W1
|- style="background:#fbb;" 
| 149 || September 19 || Mariners || 1–7 || Gilbert (6–5) || Kowar (0–4) || — || 16,872 || 67–82 || L1
|- style="background:#bfb;" 
| 150 || September 20  || @ Indians || 7–2  || Singer (5–10) || McKenzie (5–7) || — || N/A || 68–82 || W1
|- style="background:#bfb;" 
| 151 || September 20  || @ Indians || 4–2  || Tapia (3–0) || Wittgren (2–8) || Barlow (14) || 11,459 || 69–82 || W2
|- style="background:#fbb;" 
| 152 || September 21 || @ Indians || 1–4 || Quantrill (7–3) || Lynch (4–6) || Clase (24) || 23,341 || 69–83 || L1
|- style="background:#bbb;" 
| — || September 22 || @ Indians || colspan=7 | Postponed (rain, makeup September 27)
|- style="background:#bfb;" 
| 153 || September 24 || @ Tigers || 3–1 || Tapia (4–0) || Lange (0–3) || Barlow (15) || 24,877 || 70–83 || W1
|- style="background:#fbb;" 
| 154 || September 25 || @ Tigers || 1–5 || Hutchison (3–1) || Tapia (4–1) || Fulmer (12) || 16,424 || 70–84 || L1
|- style="background:#bfb;" 
| 155 || September 26 || @ Tigers || 2–1 || Bubic (6–6) || Peralta (4–4) || Barlow (16) || 23,788 || 71–84 || W1
|- style="background:#fbb;" 
| 156 || September 27 || @ Indians || 3–8 || Quantrill (8–3) || Kowar (0–5) || — || 13,121 || 71–85 || L1
|- style="background:#bfb;" 
| 157 || September 28 || Indians || 6–4 || Staumont (4–3) || Parker (2–1) || — || 11,670 || 72–85 || W1
|- style="background:#bfb;" 
| 158 || September 29 || Indians || 10–5 || Holland (3–5) || Wittgren (2–9) || — || 10,373 || 73–85 || W2
|- style="background:#fbb;" 
| 159 || September 30 || Indians || 1–6 || Allen (2–7) || Zerpa (0–1) || — || 11,288 || 73–86 || L1
|-

|- style="background:#bfb;" 
| 160 || October 1 || Twins || 11–6 || Heasley (1–1) || Gant (5–11) || — || 14,293 || 74–86 || W1
|- style="background:#fbb;" 
| 161 || October 2 || Twins || 0–4 || Jax (4–5) || Bubic (6–7) || — || 22,321 || 74–87 || L1
|- style="background:#fbb;" 
| 162 || October 3 || Twins || 3–7 || Vincent (1–0) || Kowar (0–6) || Alcalá (1) || 17,158 || 74–88 || L2
|-

|- style="text-align:center;"
| Legend:       = Win       = Loss       = PostponementBold = Royals team member

Roster

Farm system

References

External links
Kansas City Royals Official Site 
2021 Kansas City Royals at Baseball Reference

Kansas City Royals
Kansas City Royals seasons
Kansas City Royals